The Communauté de communes Intercom Balleroy Le Molay-Littry is a former communauté de communes in the Calvados department, in northern France. It was created in January 1997. It was merged into the new Communauté de communes Isigny-Omaha Intercom in January 2017.

The Communauté de communes comprised the following communes:

Balleroy-sur-Drôme
La Bazoque  
Le Breuil-en-Bessin
Cahagnolles  
Castillon 
Cormolain
Foulognes
Litteau 
Le Molay-Littry 
Montfiquet 
Noron-la-Poterie 
Planquery 
Sainte-Honorine-de-Ducy 	
Sainte-Marguerite-d'Elle
Saint-Paul-du-Vernay 
Sallen
Saon
Saonnet 	
Tournières 
Le Tronquay  
Trungy

References

Balleroy Le Molay-Littry